Petkov Nunatak (‘Petkov Nunatak’ \pet-'kov 'nu-na-tak\) is the rocky hill rising to 905 m in the west part of Zavera Snowfield, in the northeast foothills of Detroit Plateau on southern Trinity Peninsula in Graham Land, Antarctica

The nunatak is named after Nikola Petkov (b. 1951), geologist at St. Kliment Ohridski base in 1995/96 and subsequent seasons, and program organizer of the Bulgarian Antarctic Institute.

Location

Maps
 Antarctic Digital Database (ADD). Scale 1:250000 topographic map of Antarctica. Scientific Committee on Antarctic Research (SCAR). Since 1993, regularly upgraded and updated.

Notes

References
 Petkov Nunatak. SCAR Composite Antarctic Gazetteer.
 Bulgarian Antarctic Gazetteer. Antarctic Place-names Commission. (details in Bulgarian, basic data in English)

External links
 Petkov Nunatak. Copernix satellite image

Nunataks of Trinity Peninsula
Bulgaria and the Antarctic